Columbia-Brazoria Independent School District (CBISD) is a public school district based in the Kenneth C. Welch Administration Building in West Columbia, Texas (USA).

In addition to West Columbia, the district serves the city of Brazoria as well as the unincorporated communities of Wild Peach Village, Danciger, and East Columbia.

In 2009, the school district was rated "academically acceptable" by the Texas Education Agency.

Schools
Columbia High School (Grades 9-12)
West Brazos Junior High (Grades 7-8)
Barrow Elementary (Grades PK-6)
West Columbia Elementary (Grades PK-6)
Wild Peach Elementary (Grades K-5)

References

External links

Columbia-Brazoria ISD

School districts in Brazoria County, Texas
West Columbia, Texas